Meagen Fay is an American actress known for her work in television. Best known as Roxy in Ohara (1987-1988), Principal Halloron in Life With Louie (1995-1998), and Gretchen Mannkusser in Malcolm in the Middle (2002-2004) and Loot on Apple TV+.

Career
Born and raised in Joliet, Illinois, Fay was a featured cast member with Chicago's The Second City in the early 1980s.

Fay's first television role was in the 1987 television series Ohara.

She has guest-starred on numerous shows including Thirtysomething, Roseanne, Mad About You, Seinfeld, Dharma & Greg, Gilmore Girls, Suddenly Susan, Charmed and Freaks and Geeks. She starred in Carol & Company, The Home Court, Tales of the City, and Woops!, as well as appearing in Magnolia (1999). In 2004, she starred in Stephen King's Kingdom Hospital.

She has also had recurring roles on Malcolm in the Middle and The Bernie Mac Show, and has guest starred on Six Feet Under, Nip/Tuck, Desperate Housewives, The Big Bang Theory, and as Chelsea's mother on several episodes of Two and a Half Men.

She made her directorial debut with playwright Jeffrey Sweet's play Kunstler at the 59 East 59 Theaters in Manhattan.

Personal life
Fay married William Gunther, a camera operator, in January 1993.

Filmography

Film

Television

Stage

References

External links

Living people
American film actresses
American television actresses
Actresses from Illinois
American stage actresses
American voice actresses
Actors from Joliet, Illinois
20th-century American actresses
21st-century American actresses
Year of birth missing (living people)